Bennelongia is a genus of ostracod crustaceans in the family Cyprididae. It is probably endemic to Australia and New Zealand, and is predicted to be highly diverse. The genus was described in 1981 and named after Woollarawarre Bennelong, the first aboriginal to have a long association with the early European settlers of Australia. Prior to 2012, six species were described in Australia. There are currently 15 species of Bennelongia. Bennelongia may be the last true descendent genus of the Mesozoic (and now extinct) lineage of Cypridea, which was a dominant lineage of ostracod in non-marine waters in the Cretaceous.

See also
Bennelongia australis (Brady, 1886) – South Australia
Bennelongia barangaroo De Deckker, 1981 – Western Australia
Bennelongia calei Martens et al 2013 – Western Australia
Bennelongia bidgelongensis Martens et al., 2012 – Western Australia, Gascoyne
Bennelongia coondinerensis Martens et al., 2012 – Western Australia, Pilbara
Bennelongia cuensis Martens et al., 2012 – Western Australia, Yilgarn
Bennelongia cygnus Martens et al., 2012 – Western Australia, Swan Valley
Bennelongia frumenta Martens et al., 2012 – Western Australia, Wheatbelt
Bennelongia gwelupensis Martens et al., 2012 – Western Australia, Perth, southwest coast
Bennelongia harpago De Deckker & McKenzie, 1981 – Queensland (type species)
Bennelongia kimberleyensis Martens et al., 2012 – Western Australia, Kimberley
Bennelongia lata Martens et al., 2012 – Western Australia, Gascoyne–Murchison region
Bennelongia nimala De Deckker, 1981 – Northern Territory
Bennelongia pinpi De Deckker, 1981 – Queensland
Bennelongia strellyensis Martens et al., 2012 – Western Australia, Pilbara
Bennelongia tunta De Deckker, 1982 – Queensland

References

External links
 

Podocopida genera
Cyprididae